R. S. Durai Senthilkumar is an Indian film director, writer and lyricist, who is currently working in the Tamil film industry.

Career
Senthilkumar worked as an assistant director to Vetrimaaran, before making his directorial debut with Ethir Neechal (2013), starring Sivakarthikeyan, Priya Anand, and Nandita. The film, with music composed by Anirudh Ravichander, was released on 1 May 2013 to critical acclaim from critics, for which Senthilkumar was awarded the Vijay Award for Best Crew in 2014.

His next venture was Kaaki Sattai (2015), again starring Sivakarthikeyan and featuring music composed by Anirudh, alongside Sri Divya, Vijay Raaz, Prabhu. The story revolves around an honest police constable who wants to prove himself as a true, powerful cop by finding ways to solve issues of corruption in the law and order system in the department of police, and in the process thwarts an illegal organ donation scam. The film was released on 27 February 2015 to positive reviews from critics, with many praising the transition of Sivakarthikeyan from the comedy genre to the action genre.

Senthilkumar's next project was the 2016 film Kodi, starring Dhanush, Trisha and Anupama Parameswaran. The film, based on two twin brothers, one a brash politician and the other, a pacifistic, straight thinking teacher who is forced to enter politics following his twin brother's murder to avenge his killer, features music by Santhosh Narayanan. The film was Dhanush's first time doing dual roles in his career. The film was released on 28 October 2016 to a mixed-to-positive reception from critics.

His next venture is the Dhanush-starrer Pattas, again featuring the latter in dual roles along with Sneha and Mehreen Pirzada.

Filmography

References

Living people
Indian film directors
Tamil film directors
Film people from Tamil Nadu
1981 births